Turgān also known as Turkān is a valley in Hazarajat, Afghanistan located in Jaghatū district of Ghazni province.

Demographics 
Turgan Valley is inhabited with ethnic Hazaras.

See also 
 Valleys of Afghanistan
 Jaghatū District
 Hazarajat

References 

Jaghatū District
Valleys of Afghanistan
Ghazni Province
Hazarajat